The Badwater snail (Angustassiminea infima) is a species of minute, salt marsh snail endemic to the Badwater Basin in Death Valley. It is found only at low elevations near spring sources, and only in regions with relatively low precipitation. It is capable of living completely submerged in the spring water.

The species was described in 1947.

Water level decreases and trampling from hikers threaten the Badwater snail, and as of 2001 the Badwater snail is at only approximately 15% of their natural population distribution.

References

 2013 Encyclopedia of Life, Assiminea infima Downloaded on 6 June 2013
 Johnson, P.D., Bogan, A.E., Brown, K.M., Burkhead, N.M., Cordeiro, J.R., Garner, J.T., Hartfield, P.D., Lepitzki, D.A.W., Mackie, G.L., Pip, E., Tarpley, T.A., Tiemann, J.S., Whelan, N.V. and Strong, E.E. 2013. Conservation Status of Freshwater Gastropods of Canada and the United States. Fisheries 38(6): 247-282

Assimineidae
Death Valley
Fauna of the Mojave Desert
Endemic fauna of California
Molluscs of the United States
Taxonomy articles created by Polbot
Taxobox binomials not recognized by IUCN